The Rosecrans Hills are a low range of hills in the Transverse Ranges, in the South Los Angeles region of Los Angeles County, California.

The Rosecrans Hills run north–south in the communities of West Athens and Westmont. They are bisected by the Century Freeway (I−105), and Western Avenue, between Century Boulevard and El Segundo Boulevard.

Notable people

 Thomas Bones (1842–1929), farmer and land developer in this area

References 

Hills of California
Geography of Los Angeles
Mountain ranges of Los Angeles County, California
South Los Angeles
Transverse Ranges
Mountain ranges of Southern California